AAAF may refer to:

 Anguilla Amateur Athletic Federation, the governing body for the sport of athletics in Anguilla
 Asian American Action Fund, a Washington, D.C.-based Democratic political action committee
 Association Aéronautique et Astronautique de France, the French national aeronautical and astronautical association
 Association of African Air Forces, African association for military aviation organizations